The Beijing International Film Festival (Chinese: 北京国际电影节), abbreviated BJIFF,  is a film festival in Beijing, China. Founded in 2011, the film festival is supported and sponsored by China Film Administration, China Media Group and Beijing Government. The festival is one of the world's most prominent film festivals, and since its launch has been heavily attended by Hollywood executives, directors, producers and studio heads, as well as filmmakers and actors from all over the world. It serves as an international venue for different cultures around the globe to communicate.

As China's box office has expanded exponentially over the past decade, the festival is aiming to provide a high-profile forum for the interaction between the Chinese and the international film industries.

2012 Festival
Notable international guest speakers at the 2012 festival including James Cameron, who unveiled the details of the upcoming Avatar sequels at the film festival; Jim Gianopulos, Jeremy Renner, Tom DeSanto, Jon Landau, who were there to discuss co-productions between Hollywood and Chinese film studios.

2013 Festival
Notable guests at the 2013 festival includes Lucasfilm president Kathleen Kennedy, Paul Hanneman,  Keanu Reeves, and Peter Chan.  Luc Besson, Jean-Jacques Annaud, and Wolfgang Petersen also discussed their upcoming co-productions in China at the festival.

2014 Festival
The 2014 festival saw Jean Reno, Alfonso Cuaron, Paramount Pictures COO Frederick Huntsberry,  Oliver Stone, MPAA president Christopher Dodd, Peter Del Vecho, Carlos Saldanha, John Woo, Timur Bekmambetov, Peter Ziering,  Andres Vicente Gomez, Rajkumar Hirani and Jim Sheridan.  The festival also saw a large representation from the BFI, the British Film Commission and BBC, who are aiming for a closer co-production agreement with China.

2015 Festival
The 2015 festival saw Arnold Schwarzenegger, and Darren Aronofsky attend the event in April.

2016 Festival
The 2016 festival saw Natalie Portman, and Christoph Waltz as well as Brett Ratner, Sam Raimi, Yojiro Takita, Giuseppe Tornatore and Iain Smith attend the event in April.

2018 Festival

2019 Festival
The 2019 festival was held from April 13 to the 20th.

2020 Festival
The 2020 Festival was postponed owing to the COVID-19 pandemic.  It was later held from August 22 to the 29th.

2021 Festival

The 11th Beijing International Film Festival, which was originally scheduled for August 14 to 21, and postponed in the aftermath of COVID-19, was held from the 21 to 29 September 2021.

Censorship
Amid increasing criticism of China's tightening of censorship, the 2018 Festival attracted controversy when Chinese Government censors banned the Festival from screening the Oscar-winning Call Me by Your Name (film), throwing a spotlight on LGBT rights in China. In 2014, China had shut down the Beijing Independent Film Festival, and in January 2020, The China Independent Film Festival (CIFF) shut down operations, citing censorship concerns.

References

See also 
 Beijing Independent Film Festival, an independent film festival in the same city
 List of film festivals in China

 
2011 establishments in China
Recurring events established in 2011
Annual events in China